Sufyan Munir (born 3 July 1980) is a Pakistani first-class cricketer who played for Islamabad cricket team.

References

External links
 

1980 births
Living people
Pakistani cricketers
Islamabad cricketers
Cricketers from Gujrat